The Congress of the Federated States of Micronesia has 14 non-partisan members: ten members elected for a two-year term in ten single-seat constituencies and four members elected for a four-year term, one from each state at-large.

Qualifications
To become a member of the FSM Congress, either one elected on the basis of state equality (senator at-large) or one elected based on population, an individual must fulfil these following requirements according to Article 9 of the Constitution.

 Must be at least 30 years of age upon the day of election.
 Must be a resident of the state from which he or she is elected for at least 5 years.
 Must be a citizen of the FSM for at least 15 years.
 Must not be convicted of felony.

Speakers of the Congress
The Speaker of the Congress is elected for a term of two years.

Members
Members after the FSM General Election of March 3, 2015.

See also
Politics of the Federated States of Micronesia
Congress of the Trust Territory of the Pacific Islands
List of legislatures by country

References

External links
 

Micronesia
Politics of the Federated States of Micronesia
Micronesia, Federated States
1979 establishments in the Trust Territory of the Pacific Islands